Shadrack Tucker White (born September 22, 1985) is an American politician and Certified Fraud Examiner (CFE) serving as the 42nd State Auditor of Mississippi. He previously served as Director of the Mississippi Justice Institute. A Republican, White was appointed by Phil Bryant and was sworn in on July 17, 2018.

Early life and education
White was born on September 22, 1985, in Sandersville, Mississippi. White's father, Charles Robert White, and grandfather, Charles Raymond White, were oilfield pumpers. His mother, Emily Morgan White, was a public school art teacher. White grew up in Sandersville, Mississippi, and attended Sandersville Elementary and Northeast Jones High School. He was a Lindy-Callahan Scholar-Athlete for the state in 2004.

White attended the University of Mississippi and received an undergraduate degree in economics and political science in 2008. He worked for The Pew Charitable Trusts from 2008-2009 as a State Policy Fellow. In 2008, White was named a Rhodes Scholar. He studied economic and social history at St John's College, Oxford, earning a Master of Science degree, and rowed crew. In 2010, White's home county named March 24 "Shad White Day." "

White earned a Juris Doctor degree from Harvard Law School in 2014. While in law school, White was President of the Harvard chapter of the Federalist Society.

Career
In 2010, White worked as Policy and Research Director for Alan Nunnelee's successful campaign for Congress. White was later hired by Phil Bryant to work as Director of Policy in Bryant's office while Bryant was serving as Lieutenant Governor of Mississippi. In 2015, White again worked for Bryant as campaign manager for Bryant's re-election campaign.

From 2016 to 2017, White worked as a litigation attorney at Butler Snow, LLP, in Ridgeland, Mississippi. During that time, he also served as a special prosecutor in Rankin County, Mississippi. In December 2017, White was named as the director of the Mississippi Justice Institute. While White served as Director, the Mississippi Justice Institute successfully defended the constitutionality of charter schools in Mississippi in a trial court and won an Open Meetings Act case against the Lauderdale County Board of Supervisors and Natchez city government.

State auditor
On July 6, 2018, Governor Phil Bryant announced that he would appoint White to serve as Mississippi's State Auditor following the resignation of Stacey Pickering. White is the first millennial to serve in a statewide office in the Deep South. Most political observers were surprised by his appointment.

White was elected as State Auditor with no opposition in 2019.

During his time as State Auditor, White's office has investigated the largest public fraud scheme in state history. White's office also investigated pharmacy benefit managers, resulting in the largest civil settlement from a State Auditor's investigation in state history. White developed a program to increase government efficiency which was modeled after a similar program created by Rob Sand, the Democratic Iowa State Auditor.

Personal life
White, his wife Rina, and their children live in Flowood, Mississippi. They are members at St. Richard Church.

References 

1985 births
21st-century American politicians
Alumni of St John's College, Oxford
Harvard Law School alumni
Living people
Mississippi Republicans
People from Jones County, Mississippi
State Auditors of Mississippi
University of Mississippi alumni